is a former Japanese football player.

Playing career
Sawada was born in Gunma Prefecture on January 29, 1974. After graduating from high school, he joined Japan Football League (JFL) club Honda in 1992. He played many matches as right side back. In 1993, he moved to J1 League club Urawa Reds. Although he became a regular player in late 1993, he could not play at all in the match in 1994. In 1995, he moved to JFL club Kyoto Purple Sanga. The club was promoted to J1 in 1996. However he could not play at all in the match in 2 seasons and he left the club end of 1996 season. In 1998, he joined his local club Tonan SC (later Tonan SC Gunma). The club played in Prefectural Leagues and Regional Leagues. He retired end of 2004 season.

Club statistics

References

External links

sports.geocities.jp

1974 births
Living people
Association football people from Gunma Prefecture
Japanese footballers
J1 League players
Japan Football League (1992–1998) players
Honda FC players
Urawa Red Diamonds players
Kyoto Sanga FC players
Association football defenders